Neoplecostomus microps is a species of armored catfish endemic to Brazil where it occurs in the Paraíba do Sul River basin.  This species grows to a length of  SL.

References

microps
Fish of South America
Fish of Brazil
Endemic fauna of Brazil
Taxa named by Franz Steindachner
Fish described in 1877